Bruce—Grey—Owen Sound (formerly known as Bruce, Bruce—Grey and Grey—Bruce—Owen Sound) is a federal electoral district that has been represented in the House of Commons of Canada since 1935.

The riding has had a reputation of being a swing riding, but it has become more conservative in the last 10 years. It has produced many close results over the years.

History
The district was created in 1933 from Bruce North and Bruce South and was known as "Bruce" riding. Its name was changed in 1975 to "Bruce—Grey",  to "Bruce—Grey—Owen Sound" in 2000, to "Grey—Bruce—Owen Sound" in 2003, and to Bruce—Grey—Owen Sound in 2004.

This riding was left unchanged after the 2012 electoral redistribution.

Members of Parliament

This riding has elected the following Members of Parliament:

Election results

Bruce—Grey—Owen Sound

Grey—Bruce—Owen Sound

Note: Conservative vote is compared to the total of the Canadian Alliance vote and Progressive Conservative vote in 2000 election.

Bruce—Grey

Note: Canadian Alliance vote is compared to the Reform vote in 1997 election.

Bruce

				

				

					

				

Note: Progressive Conservative vote is compared to "National Government" vote in 1940 election.

Note: "National Government" vote is compared to Conservative vote in 1935 election.

See also
 List of Canadian federal electoral districts
 Past Canadian electoral districts

References

Notes

External links
 2001 Results from Elections Canada
Riding history from the Library of Parliament:
Bruce (1933 - 1975)
Bruce-Grey (1975 - 2000)
Grey-Bruce-Owen Sound (2000 - 2003)
Bruce-Grey-Owen Sound (2004 - )
Website of the Parliament of Canada
 Campaign expense data from Elections Canada

Ontario federal electoral districts
Owen Sound
1933 establishments in Ontario